Established in 1971, The Department of Management Sciences (DMS), Savitribai Phule Pune University (also known as PUMBA or Pune University MBA), is one of the premier business schools in India. It is an autonomous department of the University Of Pune (that was recently renamed as Savitribai Phule University Of Pune). PUMBA uses scores of CMAT/CAT/ATMA/XAT/MH-CET.

History 
PUMBA was established in the year 1971 as "University Department Of Management Studies (UDMS)" and later renamed as "The Department Of Management Sciences, PUMBA" in 1997. Class of 2004 was an important milestone when PUMBA became a fully autonomous institute albeit under the University Of Pune. This change enabled PUMBA to introduce a rigorous trimester based curriculum, a continuous evaluation system and an integrated internship immersion experience.

Courses Offered

MBA++ 
MBA++ is the flagship program at PUMBA. The course is covered in 22 months and is distributed over six trimesters. The course has credit system for evaluation of students with 100 available credits across electives. Batch size = 180 students, that includes about 30 students from international regions of Korea, Middle East, ASEAN and Europe. This course features dual specialization, students can choose from the following - Finance, Marketing, Human Resource, Systems, Operations and International Business.

MBA Pharma Biotech 
This course was a first in India and was initiated by PUMBA for graduates from the Pharmacy & Biotechnology sector to develop the managerial skills and prepare for a corporate stint from a leadership and general management perspective. With this course, PUMBA has successfully introduced skilled manpower in the field of Healthcare, Bio-Agriculture, Bio-Pharmaceuticals along with sectors such as Bio-informatics & Bio-suppliers.

This course is also based on the credit system. Students are evaluated within 100 credits over a period of two years which is divided in four semesters.

Executive MBA 
This is a two-year course that is distributed over four semesters. Classes for the Executive MBA students are conducted in the evenings. Students have to opt for one of the six functional specializations in the second year. The specializations for this course are Marketing, Human Resource (HR), Finance, Operations, Systems and International Business (IB). This course has been especially designed for the industry experienced people.

Ph.D 
The Ph.D Program in PUMBA generally starts in the month of February. Candidates applying for Ph.D. need to register themselves through respective research centres. The specializations for Ph.D. in PUMBA are Marketing Management, Foreign Trade Management and Biotechnology Management. Since its inception, this doctoral course has encouraged numerous researches. PUMBA has granted Ph.D. to various outstanding scholars.

BBA (HFM) 
This BBA course was introduced from 2018 with a strong focus in Hospitality and Facilities Management. The course has total 130 credits offered for 3300 marks. It consists of 6 semesters spread over 3 years.

MBA Programme, Sub Centre Nashik 
MBA Programme of Savitribai Phule Pune University at Sub-Centre Nashik operating under the highly well-endowed guidance of PUMBA. MBA Programme of Savitribai Phule Pune University at Sub-Centre Nashik initiated in 2018. The course duration is 2 years. It consists of 4 semesters spread over 2 years. The intake of the MBA Programme is 60. The Programme incorporates industry internships.

Diploma in Industrial Administration and Services Management (DIASM) 
Another first from PUMBA, a social Initiative for the Indian Army’s differently abled soldiers. This is a one year Diploma Course known as "Diploma in Industrial Administration and Services Management". This course is conducted at Queen Mary's Technical Institute (QMTI), located at Khadki, Pune. The sole purpose of this program is to safeguard upright rehabilitation of the Indian Army personnel who, while serving the country, have acquired a disability. PUMBA started this Diploma Course on 1 August 2008. As this is the social initiative started by PUMBA, faculties impart training to differently abled soldiers without expecting any monetary benefits.

PUMBA Cells 
All the important events & activities in PUMBA are organized by its students. The six cells of PUMBA work as various committees. The programs held in PUMBA have always been student-driven. The six cells are as follows:

Placement and Corporate Relations Cell 
The bridge between PUMBA and the industry is the Placement Cell.

Alumni Cell 
The exclusive alumni base of PUMBA is maintained by Alumni Cell. It engages itself in binding the alumni with their Alma Mater. Alumni Cell organizes various events for their alumni in order to preserve long lasting relations. Alumni Cell publishes  "SMRITI" – A Yearbook, designed by the students of PUMBA especially for their alumni base. It also conducts events like Chapter Meet, Nostalgia, Reminiscence, etc. The sole purpose of these events is to make the alumni base of PUMBA connect to their Alma Mater, help them recall their days in PUMBA & also share their valuable industry experiences.

Seminar Cell 
All the external facing events such as Day-seminars, National Seminar, Corporate Ensembles, Guest Lectures, Workshops are coordinated and managed by Seminar Cell.

Entrepreneurship Development Cell 
The activities or events conducted by ED Cell are organized to develop an entrepreneurial zeal in the budding entrepreneurs.

Communication Cell 
Communication Cell represents PUMBA for the external & internal world. All events in PUMBA are published by Communication Cell. It also handles PUMBA's digital strategy - Website, Social Media Platforms and all the other online web platforms to promote and educate about brand PUMBA. Communication Cell conducts events like Nukkad Pe Charcha, Summers, Dil Dosti Dopahar, ODE, Best Manager, etc. It also publishes "Nexus" - A biannual magazine for the students.

Cultural Cell 
Cultural Cell endures the heritage of PUMBA by passing on its traditions, beliefs, ethics & ideals to the upcoming batches.

Campus 
PUMBA is an autonomous department of the Savitribai Phule Pune University for the MBA Program. It is established in the midst of the university campus which has around 46 official departments.

PUMBA is equipped with 24x7 Wi-Fi Facility. It has two-storied library with the collection of more than 22,000 books and magazines & seating facility for close to 100 students. The campus also includes computer lab, auditorium and conference room & syndicate rooms.

Notable Alumni Names 
 Kay Kay Menon, Film Actor, Bollywood, India
Pavitra Singh, CHRO, PepsiCo, India
Joe John Kuruvilla, Former CEO, Raymond Group, India
Sanjay Sharma, CEO, MTR Foods, India
Sunil Kapoor, CEO and MD, Siemens Financial Services, India
Mukund Cairae, Former COO- International Business, Zee Entertainment Enterprises
Dhananjay Sengupta, CEO- Small Formats, Future Group, India
Sunil Pudi, CEO, Kores (company), India
Prashant Sharma, CTO, Cadila Healthcare, India
Shirish Bhide, CEO, United Arab Bank, Dubai
Kurush Grant, Former CEO (Tobacco Division), ITC, India
Neeraj Kapoor, Former CMO, PAYBACK (An American Express company), India
Madhur Taneja, CMO, Nayara Energy
Sudhir N Pillai, Managing director, Corning Inc., India
T S Shankar, Former Managing director, Standard Chartered and Bank of America, Singapore
Anupama Purnaik, Managing director, Russell Reynolds, Singapore
Smita Nair Jain, Senior Divisional Vice President, Sears Holdings, India
Sabiha Kazi, Director, Citigroup, India
P V Krishna, MD and Head of ECM, Goldman Sach, India
Sandeep Jain, Vice President, Private Wealth Management, Morgan Stanley, India
Bharat Iyer, MD and Head-Equity Research, JPMorgan Chase, India
Sunil Kaushik, Executive director, Goldman Sach, India
Ajay Chacko, Co-founder, Arre (brand) (U Digital Content Pvt Ltd)
Anil Sachdev, Founder and chairman, School of Inspired Leadership, India

References 

Savitribai Phule Pune University
University departments in India
Universities and colleges in Pune
Business schools in Maharashtra
Educational institutions established in 1971
1971 establishments in Maharashtra